The International Surfing Museum is a non-profit, 501(c) museum in Huntington Beach, Orange County, California. The museum's goal is to preserve the history of the surfing culture throughout the globe. It is dedicated to Duke Kahanamoku, who is generally regarded as the person who popularized the modern sport of surfing.

The International Surfing Museum displays historic surfboards, provides information about legendary surfers, and shows classic surf films. Visitors can examine artistic surfing sculptures and hear surf music. Admission to the museum is currently $2 per visitor.

The museum moved and opened in the 411 Olive Avenue location in June 1990. It was established in 1987 by Ann Beasley and Natalie Kotsch. In 1998 Ann Beasley and Natalie Kotsch were added to the Honor Roll, which "was created to honor those individuals who have contributed to surfing and it's [sic] culture and are deserving of recognition, but might not qualify to receive a stone on the [Surfing] Walk of Fame. Honor Roll recipients are selected by the Surfing Walk of Fame Board of Directors."

References

External links 
 Official International Surfing Museum website

Museums in Orange County, California
Sports museums in California
Sports in Huntington Beach, California
Surfing museums
Surfing in the United States
Buildings and structures in Huntington Beach, California
Non-profit organizations based in California
Museums established in 1987
Organizations established in 1987
1987 establishments in California
Surfing in California